Papyrus 129 (in the Gregory-Aland numbering), designated by , is a papyrus manuscript of part of the New Testament epistle 1 Corinthians.

Location
It is currently held at the Museum of the Bible and in the Stimer Collection in California. In October 2019 the Egypt Exploration Society (EES) claimed that the fragment held at the Museum of the Bible was removed without authorization from its collection by its general editor, Professor Dirk Obbink.  The Museum of the Bible acknowledges the Egyptian Exploration Society's claim of ownership and is working to restore the items to its collection. The EES has commended the Museum of the Bible for its cooperation.

See also 
 List of New Testament papyri

References

Greek-language papyri